Alladi (Telugu: అల్లాడి) is a Telugu Indian surname and given name. Notable people with the name include:

 Alladi Krishnaswamy Iyer (1883–1953), Indian lawyer and member of the Constituent Assembly of India
 Alladi Kuppu Swamy (1920–2012), Indian lawyer of Chief Justice of Andhra Pradesh High Court
 Alladi Ramakrishnan (1923–2008), Indian physicist and the founder of the Institute of Mathematical Sciences
 Krishnaswami Alladi (born 1955) Indian-American mathematician who specializes in number theory

Indian surnames